The Ecclesiastical Appeals Act 1532 (24 Hen 8 c 12), also called the Statute in Restraint of Appeals, the Act of Appeals and The Act of Restraints in Appeals, was an Act of the Parliament of England.

It was passed in the first week of April 1533. It is considered by many historians to be the key legal foundation of the English Reformation.

The Act, drafted by Thomas Cromwell on behalf of King Henry VIII of England, forbade all appeals to the Pope in Rome on religious or other matters, making the King the final legal authority in all such matters in England, Wales, and other English possessions. This was achieved by claiming that England was an Empire and the English crown was an Imperial Crown – Henry's historians claimed that they could trace the lineage back to Brutus and the fall of Troy.

This far-reaching measure made accepting papal authority, or following papal rulings in church, faith or other matters illegal. It was followed a year later by the Act of Supremacy 1534 which made Henry "the only supreme head in earth of the Church of England called Anglicana Ecclesia, and shall have and enjoy annexed and united to the imperial crown of this realm". Those in his realms had to acknowledge this as they were by Acts of Parliament that automatically changed any previous constitutional arrangements. Not to do so was high treason, which would lead to trial and execution as happened to Thomas More. The Acts enabled Thomas Cranmer to finally grant King Henry his long-desired divorce from queen Catherine of Aragon, so that he could marry Anne Boleyn.

Extract

Repeal
The whole Act, in so far as it extended to Northern Ireland, was repealed by section 1(1) of, and Schedule 1 to, the Statute Law Revision Act 1950.

The whole Act, so far as unrepealed, was repealed by section 1 of, and Part II of the Schedule to, the Statute Law (Repeals) Act 1969.

Section 2
This section was repealed by section 13(2) of, and Part I of Schedule 4 to the Criminal Law Act 1967.

Section 3
In this section, the words from "in manner and forme as hereafter ensueth" to the end were repealed by section 87 of, and Schedule 5 to, the Ecclesiastical Jurisdiction Measure 1963 (No 1).

Section 4
In this section, the words from the beginning to "any other courte or courtes" were repealed by section 87 of, and Schedule 5 to, the Ecclesiastical Jurisdiction Measure 1963 (No 1). This section, so far as unrepealed, was repealed by section 13(2) of, and Part I of Schedule 4 to the Criminal Law Act 1967.

See also
Religion in the United Kingdom
British Emperor (Imperium maius)
Caesaropapism
Halsbury's Statutes
Brexit

References

Further reading
 Harriss, Gerald L., and Penry Williams. "A revolution in Tudor history?." Past & Present 31 (1965): 87-96. at JSTOR

1533 in law
1533 in England
Acts of the Parliament of England concerning religion
1533 in Christianity